The Roman Catholic  Diocese of Autlán (erected 28 January 1961) is a suffragan diocese of the Archdiocese of Guadalajara.

Bishops

Ordinaries
Miguel González Ibarra (1961-1967) 
Everardo López Alcocer (1967-1968) 
José Maclovio Vásquez Silos (1969-1990) 
Lázaro Pérez Jiménez (1991-2003) 
Gonzalo Galván Castillo (2004-2015)
Rafael Sandoval Sandoval (2015-)

Other priests of this diocese who became bishops
Luis Robles Díaz, appointed nuncio and titular Archbishop in 1985
José Francisco Robles Ortega, appointed Auxiliary Bishop of Toluca, México in 1991; future Cardinal
Jonás Guerrero Corona, appointed Auxiliary Bishop of México, Federal District in 2001

Episcopal See
Autlán, Jalisco

External links and references

Autlan
Autlán, Roman Catholic Diocese of
Autlán
Autlán
1961 establishments in Mexico